Cantonment Clinch was an Army fort in Pensacola, Florida built about 1822 (originally called Camp Hope and Camp Brady) and active through the early 1830s. It was established to house United States troops during a yellow fever epidemic in Pensacola and at Fort Barrancas.

History
Officers took United States Army troops to this location to flee an outbreak of yellow fever at other forts and in Pensacola city; they built this cantonment at the head of Bayou Chico circa 1822. The Cantonment lay three miles west of Pensacola. It was then a small town of 181 households, with about one-third the population of mixed race, reflecting its Creek, European and African residents, and their descendants of unions.  In 1823, the military renamed this Camp Galvez Spring, and later that year as Cantonment Clinch, after a beloved colonel of their regiment.

The cantonment was built to include ten log barracks and ten quarters for officers, arrayed around a large parade ground. The Post Surgeon began recording weather observations in 1822, summarized in the Army Meteorological Register.

The US Army likely drew from these forces in local wars against the Pensacola and Creek tribes, as well as early Seminole Wars. The Seminole relocated to central Florida. The US military also used their troops to construct roads to other military facilities in west Florida and adjacent portions of Alabama.

The post closed circa 1830; the troops were evacuated to Baton Rouge, Louisiana.

References

External links
 "Cantonment Clinch", NorthAmericanForts.com

Closed installations of the United States Army
Forts in Florida
1822 establishments in Florida Territory